Fürstenberg-Möhringen was a County of Fürstenberg. It was a partition of Fürstenberg-Blumberg, and was inherited by the Counts of Fürstenberg-Stühlingen in 1641.

Counts of Fürstenberg-Möhringen (1599 - 1641)
Wratislaw I (1599 - 1631)
Francis II (1631 - 1640)
Francis Wratislaw (1640 - 1641)

Fürstenberg (princely family)
Counties of the Holy Roman Empire
States and territories established in 1599